Il figlioccio del padrino (The Godson of the Godfather) is a 1973 Italian comedy film directed by Mariano Laurenti. A parody of the 1972 film The Godfather, it was mainly shot in Acireale. The film got a good commercial success, grossing about 500 million lire.

Cast 

Franco Franchi: Oronzo Musumeci
Saro Urzì: Don Salvatore Trizzino
Laura Belli: Apollonia Trizzino
Carla Romanelli: Onesta Trizzino 
Maurizio Arena: Don Vincenzo Russo
Riccardo Garrone: Petruzzo
Nunzio Gallo: himself
Tiberio Murgia:  mafiaman
Gianni Bonagura: RAI-TV General Manager

References

External links

1973 films
Films directed by Mariano Laurenti
Films scored by Carlo Rustichelli
Italian parody films
Parody films based on The Godfather
1970s parody films
1973 comedy films
1970s American films
1970s Italian films